Soatris Island is the rocky island off the northwest coast of Pasteur Peninsula on Brabant Island in the Palmer Archipelago, Antarctica, which extends 400 m in east-southeast to west-northwest direction and is 200 m wide.

The island is named after the ancient Roman settlement of Soatris in Northeastern Bulgaria.

Location
British mapping in 1980 and 2008.

Maps
 Antarctic Digital Database (ADD). Scale 1:250000 topographic map of Antarctica. Scientific Committee on Antarctic Research (SCAR). Since 1993, regularly upgraded and updated.
British Antarctic Territory. Scale 1:200000 topographic map. DOS 610 Series, Sheet W 64 62. Directorate of Overseas Surveys, Tolworth, UK, 1980.
Brabant Island to Argentine Islands. Scale 1:250000 topographic map. British Antarctic Survey, 2008.

References
 Bulgarian Antarctic Gazetteer. Antarctic Place-names Commission. (details in Bulgarian, basic data in English)
 Soatris Island. SCAR Composite Antarctic Gazetteer.

External links
 Soatris Island. Copernix satellite image

Islands of the Palmer Archipelago
Bulgaria and the Antarctic